The Simple Clinical Colitis Activity Index (SCCAI) is a diagnostic tool and questionnaire used to assess the severity of symptoms in people who suffer from ulcerative colitis. It was created in 1998 and is still used to assess the severity of symptoms. It is also used for research purposes to determine the efficacy of various treatments aimed at relieving symptoms.  The calculated score ranges from 0 to 19, where active disease is a score of 5 or higher.

The score is determined by asking the person with colitis questions regarding:

 Bowel frequency at day/night
 Urgency of defecation
 Blood in stool
 General health
 Extracolonic manifestations

References 

Abdominal pain
Autoimmune diseases
Colitis
Conditions diagnosed by stool test
Inflammations
Noninfective enteritis and colitis
Medical lists